Tayeb Meziani (born February 27, 1996) is an Algerian footballer who plays for Abha.

At the end of the 2016–17 Algerian Ligue Professionnelle 2 season, Tayeb Meziani was selected as the best player of the season.

On June 1, 2017, Meziani was called up to the Algeria national football team for the first time for a friendly match against Guinea and a 2019 Africa Cup of Nations qualifier against Togo.

On January 6, 2019, Meziani played his first game with Espérance Sportive de Tunis against Club Africain, Meziani was selected as one of the best players in the Tunisian Derby.

Career statistics

International

Honours
Paradou AC
Algerian Ligue Professionnelle 2 (1): 2016–17

Espérance de Tunis
Tunisian Ligue Professionnelle 1 (1): 2018–19
CAF Champions League (1): 2019
Tunisian Super Cup (1): 2019

Algeria
FIFA Arab Cup: 2021

References

External links
 
 

1996 births
Algeria under-23 international footballers
Algeria A' international footballers
Algerian expatriate footballers
Algerian footballers
Algerian Ligue 2 players
Tunisian Ligue Professionnelle 1 players
Le Havre AC players
Living people
Paradou AC players
Footballers from Algiers
A Lyga players
FC Stumbras players
Espérance Sportive de Tunis players
Abha Club players
Saudi Professional League players
Association football forwards
21st-century Algerian people
Expatriate footballers in France
Expatriate footballers in Lithuania
Expatriate footballers in Tunisia
Expatriate footballers in Saudi Arabia
Algerian expatriate sportspeople in France
Algerian expatriate sportspeople in Tunisia
Algerian expatriate sportspeople in Saudi Arabia